YoungGuns International Award (also referenced as YoungGuns Award and YGAward) is an annual global award show for young and emerging creative talent in the advertising and communication industry. The award recognizes the best young commercial practitioners and students across the fields of advertising, communication design, digital creative, advertising media and public relations from around the world. Entrants into the award must be aged 30 or under.

Entrants for the award compete for gold, silver and bronze awards across 8 divisions and 40 categories. Every year, two ultimate winners will be determined and named YoungGun of the Year and YoungGun Student of the Year.

History 
Kristian Barnes, Jason Williams, and Michael Kean (CEO of market-leading global creative recruitment firm FBI Recruitment) founded the YoungGuns Award in 2001 from Sydney, Australia with the goal of recognizing and promoting upcoming talent rather than rewarding years of experience. They noted that the reason for starting the award was their frustration that major awards at the time were typically won by well established individuals within the industry.

Innovation 
The YoungGuns Award show introduced a number of innovations in the award category. It was the first international award show focused solely on young and emerging talent, participants had to be under 30 to qualify for entry. It was first international award to produce an advertising campaign for its call of entries (see below). It was the first to offer prizes to the winners, for the YoungGun of the Year it was a cash prize as well as a place on the following years jury, and for the YoungGun Student of the Year it was a work placement with an international agency (Leo Burnett). It was the first to take the winners and finalists work on a travelling exhibition (including Australia, NZ, UK, US, HK, India Singapore, South Africa and Japan). It also introduced 20Guns - a peer voting system where the top voted work would be entered free of charge into the YoungGuns Award

Call for entry 
YoungGuns was the first international award to produce an advertising campaign for its call of entries. The campaigns are renowned for being controversial. Most notable include "Peak Early" which focused on child prodigies;  "Quit in Style" which allowed anyone to upload content such as videos and feedback to demonstrate how they would quit their jobs; 'Worth the Pain' which encouraged creatives to push through to greatness but told them in detail about the effect it would have on their bodies and "Hardly Legal" a porn inspired tribute to creativity. Despite the controversy the yearly campaigns have proven to be quite appealing to the creative industry. Some campaigns have managed to receive recognition in other creative awards such as the One Club New Zealand Grande Axis and Cannes Lions International Advertising Festival.

The call for entries campaigns are usually created by selective advertising agencies or creative collaborations from all around the world. Some of the past Call for Entry campaign creators included Droga5, The Glue Society, Taxi, Crispin, Porter + Bogusky and Saatchi & Saatchi (New Zealand).

Jury panel 
The jury consists of an international panel of over a world class Creative Leader (2014 Jury Chairman announced as Dave Douglas - Partner / ECD of Anomaly Toronto), the best up & coming creative stars from the majority of global advertising agency networks, as well as the previous year's winner - the "YoungGuns of the Year".

Past YoungGuns of the Year 
 2001 Guy Shelmerdine and Grant Holland (Cliff Freeman & Partners New York)
 2002 Antony Nelson (Saatchi & Saatchi London)
 2003 Trevor Clarence (Terraplane South Africa)
 2004 Travis Sorge (Saatchi & Saatchi Los Angeles)
 2005 Juan Cabral (Fallon London) - most notable for creating and directing Cadbury Dairy Milk's Gorilla (advertisement) in 2007
 2006 Matt Devine and Luke Crethar (Glue Society Sydney)
 2007 Jeff Anderson and Isaac Silvergate (TBWA Chiat Day New York)
 2008 Craig Allen and Eric Kallman (TBWA Chiat Day New York)
 2009 Michael Canning (Leo Burnett Sydney)
 2010 Douglas Goh (McCann Erickson Malaysia)
 2011 Alexander Nowak and Felix Richter (Y&R New York)
 2012 Rasmus Keger and Morten Halvorsen (R/GA New York)
 2013 Tarik Abdel-Gawad (Bot & Dolly New York)
2014 Laura Jones and Nick Bygraves (Leo Burnett, Toronto)

Past YoungGuns Students of the Year 

 2001 Nick C Tamburri and Lina Yoko Hitomi (Art Centre College of Design, California)
 2002 Mikael Strom and Yasin Lekorchi (Berghs School of Communication, Sweden)
 2003 Satoko Takada and Parwin Lawrence (Miami Ad School, USA)
 2004 Christina de la Cruz, Tom Zukoski and Matt Burgess (Miami Ad School, Minneapolis)
 2005 Menno Kluin (Miami Ad School Europe, Germany)
 2006 Eleanor Bullen and Angie Bird (RMIT, Melbourne)
 2007 Jesse Synder and Rene Delgado (Miami Ad School, Minneapolis)
 2008 Savina Mokreva, Voldemars Dudums and Mihena Gheorghiu (Miami Ad School Europe, Germany)
 2009 Duncan Munge, Amadeus Henhapl and Zoe Sys Voglius (Miami Ad School Europe, Germany)
 2010 Raúl Cosculluela, Nikolai Shorr, Bona Jeong, HyoJoo Kim, Chung Woo Lee and Gue Rim Lee (SVA Unconventional Advertising, New York)
 2011 Edi Inderbitzin & Maximilian Gebhardt and Maximilian Hoch (Miami Ad School Europe, Germany)
 2012 Caio Brandao Andrade and Lucas Oliveria (Escola Superior de Propaganda e Marketing, Brazil)
 2013 Patrick Tamisiea and Hugo Gstrein (Miami Ad School, Hamburg)
 2014 Janssen Brothers (Willem de Kooning Academie, The Netherlands)

YoungGuns of the Decade 
In 2010 YoungGuns announced the best young individual talent, agencies and advertising schools based on awarded entries from its first 10 years. The YoungGun of the Decade was Jeff Anderson (Goodby Silverstein & Partners, San Francisco), the YoungGun Agency of the Decade was BBDO   and the Advertising School of the Decade was Miami Ad School, Europe.

References

Advertising awards